The Betrayed is a 1993 Dutch drama film made for television directed by Frans Weisz. It was entered into the 43rd Berlin International Film Festival.

Cast
Gijs Scholten van Aschat	... 	Henk Grond
Renée Soutendijk	... 	Olga Grond
Coen Flink	... 	Grewestein
Annet Malherbe	... 	Mien
Willem Nijholt	... 	Krynie Woudema
Adriaan Adriaanse	... 	Florist
Belou Den Tex	... 	Fried Folters
Frans de Wit	... 	Gorilla
Marieke Heebink	... 	Alie
Damien Hope	... 	Charly
Ferry Kaljee	... 	Knockouter
Mark Rietman	... 	Surgeon
Gerardjan Rijnders	... 	Psychiatrist
Johan Simons	... 	Detective 1
Wouter Steenbergen	... 	Sjel van Relte
Evert van der Meulen	... 	Detective 2
Marisa Van Eyle	... 	Emmy
Jack Wouterse	... 	Pees

References

External links 
 

1993 films
1990s Dutch-language films
1993 drama films
Films directed by Frans Weisz
Dutch drama films